The Town of Bennett is a Statutory Town located in Adams and Arapahoe counties, Colorado, United States. The town population was 2,862 at the 2020 United States Census with 2,443 residing in Adams County and 419 residing in Arapahoe County. Bennett is a part of the Denver-Aurora-Lakewood, CO Metropolitan Statistical Area and the Front Range Urban Corridor.

History
Bennett was incorporated on January 22, 1930, and was named for Hiram Pitt Bennet, congressional delegate from the Territory of Colorado and Colorado Secretary of State.

Colorado spam king
Edward Davidson, known also as the "Colorado Spam King", operated an illegal spamming company, Power promotions, from July 2002 through April 2007 from a home near Bennett where he had a large network of computers and servers, according to federal authorities. The spam contained false header information, concealing the actual sender from the recipient of the e-mail. Davidson provided spammed messages for about 19 different companies, prosecutors said. Some of the e-mailed pitches were used to dupe stock investors and manipulate the market, federal authorities said. Davidson was sentenced to 21 months in federal prison and ordered to pay $714,139 to the Internal Revenue Service. On July 20, 2008, he escaped from a minimum-security prison. Four days later, he was found dead with his wife and a child, both also dead, in an apparent murder-suicide near Bennett.

Kiowa Crossing and train wreck
Until 1878, the town was known as Kiowa Crossing. On May 21 of that year, a heavy rainstorm washed out the railroad bridge over Kiowa Creek to the east of town. A Kansas Pacific Railway train of 25 cars loaded with scrap iron was washed into the stream with crewmen Frank Seldon, George Piatt, and John Bacon on board. Most of the wrecked train was recovered, but the locomotive #51 was never officially found. In 1989, archivist Lloyd Glasier at Union Pacific discovered that the railroad had found the locomotive, secretly lifted it to the surface and tugged it to their workshop, repaired it, put it back into service with a new number, and collected the insurance money for its loss in an insurance fraud. The story of the lost locomotive inspired Clive Cussler to write Night Probe!; his nonprofit NUMA later searched for the locomotive.

Opera controversy
The town achieved national notoriety in February 2006 when a number of parents of elementary schoolchildren criticized a local teacher for showing in class a video of Gounod's classic opera Faust, featuring world renowned and critically acclaimed soprano Dame Joan Sutherland. Parents said their children were traumatized by the appearance of a leering devil in the video, a man appearing to be killed by a sword in silhouette, and an allusion to suicide. Tresa Waggoner, the teacher who showed the video, was required to send a letter of apology for her actions to parents.

Geography
Bennett is located at  (39.753604, -104.428580), at the intersection of State Highways 36 and 79, just north of Interstate 70.

At the 2020 United States Census, the town had a total area of  including  of water.

The highest temperature ever recorded in Colorado occurred in Bennett on July 11, 1888, when it reached 118 °F (48 °C).

Demographics

As of the census of 2000, there were 2,021 people, 715 households, and 539 families residing in the town. The racial makeup of the town was 94.56% White, 0.49% African American, 0.74% Native American, 0.30% Asian, 0.15% Pacific Islander, 1.63% from other races, and 2.13% from two or more races. Hispanic or Latino of any race were 4.45% of the population.

There were 715 households, out of which 49.2% had children under the age of 18 living with them, 58.3% were married couples living together, 10.9% had a female householder with no husband present, and 24.5% were non-families. 21.0% of all households were made up of individuals, and 6.7% had someone living alone who was 65 years of age or older. The average household size was 2.83 and the average family size was 3.30.

In the town, the population was spread out, with 34.5% under the age of 18, 7.0% from 18 to 24, 34.7% from 25 to 44, 18.1% from 45 to 64, and 5.6% who were 65 years of age or older. The median age was 31 years. For every 100 females, there were 103.7 males. For every 100 females age 18 and over, there were 97.8 males.

The median income for a household in the town was $46,600, and the median income for a family was $50,881. Males had a median income of $38,672 versus $26,354 for females. The per capita income for the town was $17,905. About 3.7% of families and 5.8% of the population were below the poverty line, including 5.9% of those under age 18 and 8.9% of those age 65 or over.

Notable people

Hiram Pitt Bennet (September 2, 1826 – November 11, 1914), congressional delegate from the Territory of Colorado and Colorado Secretary of State
Tim Samaras (1957–2013), engineer and storm chaser who starred on Discovery Channel's documentary reality television series Storm Chasers

See also

Colorado
Bibliography of Colorado
Index of Colorado-related articles
Outline of Colorado
List of counties in Colorado
List of municipalities in Colorado
List of places in Colorado
List of statistical areas in Colorado
Front Range Urban Corridor
North Central Colorado Urban Area
Denver-Aurora, CO Combined Statistical Area
Denver-Aurora-Lakewood, CO Metropolitan Statistical Area
The Sea Hunters: True Adventures With Famous Shipwrecks

References

External links

Town of Bennett official website
CDOT map of the Town of Bennett

Towns in Adams County, Colorado
Towns in Arapahoe County, Colorado
Towns in Colorado
Denver metropolitan area